The University of Selangor (abbreviation: UNISEL) is a private university in Selangor, Malaysia, wholly owned and managed by the Selangor state government independently — without funding from the Malaysian federal government (and is thus regarded as a "private" as opposed to a "public" university).

It operates two campuses: Bestari Jaya Campus & Shah Alam Campus.

History 
UNISEL was established on 23 August 1999 as the first state-funded semi-government university in Malaysia. It had the aim of providing tertiary education and opportunities for research and development in the broad sphere of industrial technology, management as well as information and communications technology.

It began operations from a temporary campus in Shah Alam. Its main campus in the township of Bestari Jaya, approximately 50 km from the federal capital of Kuala Lumpur, was completed in 2005. UNISEL now operates from the Shah Alam and Bestari Jaya campuses.

Organisation and administration 
UNISEL is owned and managed by the State Government of Selangor through Pendidikan Industri YS Sdn. Bhd., a subsidiary of the state-owned investment arm, Kumpulan Darul Ehsan Berhad and established under the provisions of the Private Higher Education Institutions Act 1996. It is one of two institutions of higher education owned by the state government via PIYS: the other being INPENS International College.

Principal officers

Chancellors

Vice-chancellors

Campuses and faculties 
UNISEL operates from two campuses: one in the township of Bestari Jaya and another in the state capital, Shah Alam.

Bestari Jaya 
The main campus is on a  lot which is part of a  piece of land that has been earmarked as the Selangor Educational Park. It is the location of the following faculties:

 Faculty of Education and Social Sciences
 Faculty of Engineering & Life Sciences
 Engineering Department
 Science & Biotechnology Department (known formerly as Faculty of Science and Biotechnology.  Established prior to 1999 as Faculty of Applied Science and Mathematics and Faculty of Science and Environmental Technology)
 Faculty of Communication, Visual Art and Computing:
 Computing Department
 Communication Department
 Visual Art Department
(https://fcvac.unisel.edu.my)
 Centre for Foundation and General Studies

Shah Alam 
The Shah Alam campus is in Section 7 of the city and is the location of the following faculties

 Faculty of Business and Accountancy
 Faculty of Health Sciences (https://fsk.unisel.edu.my)

See also
 List of universities in Malaysia

References

External links 

 

 
Educational institutions established in 1999
1999 establishments in Malaysia
Private universities and colleges in Malaysia